Small Sins is the debut album by Small Sins, formerly known as The Ladies and Gentlemen, released in 2006.

Track listing
"Won't Make It Easier"
"Threw It All Away"
"Stay"
"Small Sins / Big Within"
"She's the Source"
"It's Easy"
"Too Much to Lose"
"We Won't Last the Winter"
"At Least You Feel Something"
"Is She the One?"
"All Will Be Fine" (Bonus Track)

External links
Small Sins at Boompa Store

Astralwerks albums
2006 debut albums
Small Sins albums